Abdullahi Ibrahim Gobir (born 1 January 1958)  is a Nigerian politician who is Senator for Sokoto East since May 2011. He is Senate Majority Leader since July 2022.

Gobir holds a master's degree in electrical engineering from the University of Detroit in the United States, and a doctoral degree in electrical engineering and energy from Abubakar Tafawa Balewa University in Bauchi, Nigeria.
He is a Chartered Engineer and a Fellow of the Institute of Electrical Engineers (UK) and of the Nigerian Society of Engineers.

Gobir began his career with the Ministry of Communication, and then joined the Nigerian Television Authority in Sokoto. 
He became the Director of Union Bank of Nigeria in 2002.
He also became the Managing Director of Taifo Multi Services Limited, Abuja.
Before entering politics, he was the Chairman of the Cement Company of Northern Nigeria, based in the state.

At the PDP primaries, Gobir defeated the incumbent Senator Abubakar Umar Gada by 1,547 against 60 votes.
He went on to be elected to the Senate.

In July 2022, Senator Gobir was selected as APC senate majority leader.

References

Living people
Sokoto
Peoples Democratic Party members of the Senate (Nigeria)
1953 births
Alumni of the University of Liverpool
Sokoto State
People from Sokoto State
Abubakar Tafawa Balewa University alumni